William Masters (25 June 1858 – 2 October 1897) was a Scotland international rugby union player.

Rugby Union career

Amateur career

Masters played rugby union for Edinburgh Institution F.P.

Provincial career

He played for Edinburgh District in their inter-city match against Glasgow District on 1 December 1877. He was moved to the Quarter Back position as Ninian Finlay and Bill Maclagan played at Half Back. Masters won the match for Edinburgh by scoring a drop goal.

He played for the East of Scotland District in their match against West of Scotland District on 9 February 1878. Again, Masters played at Quarter Back.

He played for the Whites Trial side against the Blues Trial side on 16 February 1878.

International career

Masters was capped three times by Scotland from 1879 to 1880. He scored a try in the match against Ireland on 14 February 1880.

Death

Masters had trips of South America working as a civil engineer to Buenos Aires and Valparaíso

He died in Argentina. He is noted as a railwayman. He was buried in Edinburgh at the Dean Cemetery 2c.

References

1858 births
1897 deaths
Scottish rugby union players
Scotland international rugby union players
Edinburgh Institution F.P. players
Whites Trial players
Edinburgh District (rugby union) players
East of Scotland District players
Rugby union players from Edinburgh